Winnebago is a village in Thurston County, Nebraska, United States. The population was 916 at the 2020 census.

History
The first post office at Winnebago was established in 1867. It was named for the federally recognized Winnebago tribe,   whose name for themselves (autonym) is Ho-Chunk; they have a reservation in the county. The village is Nįšoc in the Hoocąk language.

Geography
Winnebago is located at  (42.237167, -96.471582). It is located within the Winnebago Reservation of the Ho-Chunk.

Demographics

2020 census
As of the census of 2020, the population was 916. The racial makeup of the village was 92.8% Native American, 3.5% White, 0.1% Pacific Islander, 1.2% from other races, and 2.4% from two or more races. Ethnically, the population was 4.6% Hispanic or Latino of any race.

2010 census
As of the census of 2010, there were 774 people, 200 households, and 151 families living in the village. The racial makeup of the village was 4.4% White, 0.1% African American, 90.6% Native American, 0.1% from other races, and 4.8% from two or more races. Hispanic or Latino of any race were 4.0% of the population.

There were 200 households, of which 62.0% had children under the age of 18 living with them, 24.0% were married couples living together, 36.5% had a female householder with no husband present, 15.0% had a male householder with no wife present, and 24.5% were non-families. 23.0% of all households were made up of individuals, and 11.5% had someone living alone who was 65 years of age or older. The average household size was 3.84 and the average family size was 4.51.

The median age in the village was 21.4 years. 43.5% of residents were under the age of 18; 10.9% were between the ages of 18 and 24; 20.4% were from 25 to 44; 17.8% were from 45 to 64; and 7.4% were 65 years of age or older. The gender makeup of the village was 48.3% male and 51.7% female.

2000 census
As of the census of 2000, there were 768 people, 211 households, and 166 families living in the village. The population density was 2,704.4 people per square mile (1,059.0/km). There were 233 housing units at an average density of 820.5 per square mile (321.3/km). The racial makeup of the village was 5.47% White, 0.13% African American, 91.93% Native American, 1.95% from other races, and 0.52% from two or more races. Hispanic or Latino of any race were 2.73% of the population.

There were 211 households, out of which 50.7% had children under the age of 18 living with them, 30.8% were married couples living together, 38.9% had a female householder with no husband present, and 20.9% were non-families. 19.0% of all households were made up of individuals, and 10.0% had someone living alone who was 65 years of age or older. The average household size was 3.58 and the average family size was 4.01.

In the village, the population was spread out, with 42.7% under the age of 18, 8.7% from 18 to 24, 28.0% from 25 to 44, 14.1% from 45 to 64, and 6.5% who were 65 years of age or older. The median age was 23 years. For every 100 females, there were 99.0 males. For every 100 females age 18 and over, there were 78.9 males.

As of 2000 the median income for a household in the village was $20,795, and the median income for a family was $21,818. Males had a median income of $18,958 versus $19,643 for females. The per capita income for the village was $6,317. About 43.7% of families and 48.6% of the population were below the poverty line, including 55.6% of those under age 18 and 33.3% of those age 65 or over.

Notable people
 John Raymond Rice (1914-1950) - Ho-Chunk casualty in the Korean War; US Army veteran.
 Lillian St. Cyr (1884-1974) - Winnebago (Ho-Chunk) actress and star of The Squaw Man
 Julius Drum (1958-2007) - Ho-Chunk actor who acted in Thunderheart

References

External links
 Winnebago Tribe of Nebraska
 Little Priest Tribal College (specializing in American Indian Studies)

Villages in Thurston County, Nebraska
Villages in Nebraska
Seats of government of American Indian reservations